John Bush Shinn III (February 17, 1935October 16, 2020) was an American country music singer, songwriter, and musician. Nicknamed the "Country Caruso", Bush was best known for his distinctive voice and for writing the song "Whiskey River", a top 10 hit for himself which also became the signature song of fellow country artist Willie Nelson. He was especially popular in his native Texas.

Early life
Bush was born John Bush Shinn III in the Kashmere Gardens neighborhood of Houston. He listened to the western swing music of Bob Wills and His Texas Playboys and the honky-tonk sounds of artists such as Ernest Tubb, Lefty Frizzell, and Hank Thompson. His uncle, the host of a local radio program on KTHT, urged Bush and his brother to play on air, giving Bush his first experience of performing in public. Bush subsequently moved to San Antonio in 1952, beginning a solo career in area honky-tonks such as the Texas Star Inn, before switching to drums.  During this period, he earned his stage name, when an announcer mistakenly introduced him as "Johnny Bush". As a drummer, he worked for bands such as the  Mission City Playboys, the Texas Plainsmen, and the Texas Top Hands.

Career

Early years
Bush joined Ray Price's band, the Cherokee Cowboys, in 1963 along with a young Willie Nelson and Darrell McCall. His association with Price led Bush to Nashville and a contract to sing for record demonstrations. He also played in Nelson's band, the Record Men. With Nelson's financial backing Bush recorded his first album in 1967, The Sound of a Heartache.

Stardom and vocal problems
A series of regional hits on the Stop label, including "You Gave Me a Mountain" (penned by Marty Robbins), "Undo the Right" (penned by Willie Nelson and Hank Cochran), "What A Way To Live", and "I'll Be There" soon followed.  Rock critic Robert Christgau said that Bush's version of "You Gave Me A Mountain" "brings a catch to the throat and a tear to the eye." These songs did well in Bush's native Texas, and reached the national top 20. In 1972, he was signed to RCA Records whose Nashville division was headed by legendary guitarist Chet Atkins. His first RCA single, "Whiskey River" was climbing the charts with airplay on countless radio stations when his voice began faltering. Bush even felt he was being punished by God for his sins. Bush has since said: "I thought because of my promiscuous behavior and bad choices and being raised as a Baptist, that it was a punishment from God."

Bush lost half of his vocal range and was sometimes unable to talk. RCA dropped him in 1974 after three albums, he developed a drug habit and was often stricken with performance anxiety when he was able to perform at all. After several misdiagnoses, doctors diagnosed the cause in 1978 when they discovered he had a rare neurological disorder called spasmodic dysphonia.  Although this did not prevent him from recording, Bush's career began to take a downturn. He worked with a vocal coach in 1985, and was able to regain 70% of his original voice.

Later years
Bush teamed with Darrell McCall in 1986, recording a successful honky-tonk album Hot Texas Country and began assembling a large country band (as did Willie Nelson) performing around South Texas. In 1994, the band released Time Changes Everything, the same year that RCA released a greatest-hits album. A major tour soon followed. In recent years, Bush has continued to tour regularly, often performing with Nelson.

Several albums on local Texas labels soon followed. His renewed visibility made him a mentor figure to younger Texas musicians who revered the honky-tonk/hardcore country sound that Bush has done so much to keep in the public eye. Austin musicians such as Dale Watson and Cornell Hurd sought him out to play on their albums. In 2003, he was inducted into the Texas Country Music Hall of Fame with his lifelong friend Willie Nelson on hand to induct him. In 2007, he released his autobiography, with the aid of Rick Mitchell: Whiskey River (Take My Mind): The True Story of Texas Honky-Tonk, published by University of Texas Press. A new album, Kashmere Garden Mud: A Tribute to Houston’s Country Soul, was released on the Icehouse label at the same time.

With the success of his recent Botox treatments for his vocal condition and his successful career revival, Bush was a spokesman for people afflicted with vocal disorders. In 2002, he was honored with the Annie Glenn Award from the National Council of Communicative Disorders for Bush's work in bringing attention to the condition of spasmodic dysphonia. Bush self-released The Absolute Johnny Bush, a full-length album of new recordings, in June 2017. It included collaborations with Dale Watson and Reckless Kelly.

Bush died at a hospital in San Antonio on October 16, 2020.  He was 85, and suffered from pneumonia in the time leading up to his death.

Discography

Albums

Source: AllMusic

Singles

Source: AllMusic, unless otherwise stated.

References

Bibliography

Sources

External links 
Official website
[ Johnny Bush] at Allmusic
 
Johnny Bush at CMT
Johnny Bush at Lone Star Music
Johnny Bush at Find a Grave

1935 births
2020 deaths
American country singer-songwriters
Country musicians from Texas
Deaths from pneumonia in Texas
Musicians from Houston
Musicians from San Antonio
Singer-songwriters from Texas